Shy Leopardess is a fantasy novel by Leslie Barringer, the third and last book in his three volume Neustrian Cycle. The book was first published in the United Kingdom by Methuen in 1948. Its significance was recognized by its republication in the United States by the Newcastle Publishing Company as the thirteenth volume of the Newcastle Forgotten Fantasy Library series in October, 1977. The Newcastle edition was reprinted by Borgo Press in 1980.

Plot
The novel is set around the 14th century in an alternate medieval France called Neustria (historically an early division of the Frankish kingdom). Yolande, whose estate has been wrested from her by her forced marriage to the depraved Balthasar, schemes to recover her independence with the aid of her admirers, Diomede and Lioncel.

Contents
Chapter headings of the 1948 edition:
Encounters at Parledin.
Azo's way.
Roclatour and Sanctlamine.
A silver shield and a grey kitten.
Balthasar's way.
Jehane's way.
The way of Dom Ursus Campestris.
Belphegor's way.
The secret servants of Yolande.
Passing bells at Roclatour.
Fruit of thunder.
Belphagor's way again.
"My Diomede, my Lioncel".
Yolande's way.
A queen from the east.

Reception
John Clute, in his evaluation of the Neustrian Cycle, notes that "Of the three protagonists, Yolande of Baraine – the Shy Leopardess of the third novel – is perhaps the most interesting, as she successfully gambles her life (her "virtue" does not last the course) to gain autonomy in a male-dominated world."

Lin Carter cited the first American edition of 1977 from Newcastle as one of that year's best fantasy books.

Notes

References

 Reginald, Robert. Xenograffiti: essays on fantastic literature. (2005 second edition), I. O. Evans Studies in the Philosophy and Criticism of Literature, number 33 Borgo Press ISSN 0271-9061 
 De Camp, L. Sprague. Literary Swordsmen and Sorcerers: the Makers of Heroic Fantasy. Arkham House, 1976. 

1948 British novels
British fantasy novels
Novels set in France
British alternative history novels
Methuen Publishing books
Novels set in the 14th century
Historical fantasy novels